The Chinese Academy of Engineering (CAE) is the national academy of the People's Republic of China for engineering.  It was established in 1994 and is an institution of the State Council of China. The CAE and the Chinese Academy of Sciences are often referred to together as the "Two Academies". Its current president is Li Xiaohong.

Since the establishment of CAE, entrusted by the relevant ministries and commissions, the Academy has offered consultancy to the State on major programs, planning, guidelines, and policies. With the incitation by various ministries of the central government as well as local governments, the Academy has organized its members to make surveys on the forefront, and to put forward strategic opinions and proposals. These entrusted projects have played an important role in maximizing the participation of the members in the macro decision-making of the State. In the meantime, the members, based on their own experiences and perspectives accumulated in a long term and in combination with international trends of the development of engineering science and technology, have regularly and actively put forward their opinions and suggestions.

List of presidents 
 Zhu Guangya (1994–1998)
 Song Jian (1998–2002)
 Xu Kuangdi (2002–2010)
 Zhou Ji (2010–2018)
 Li Xiaohong (2018–present)

Structure 
The CAE is composed of elected members with the highest honor in the community of engineering and technological sciences of the nation.
The General Assembly of the CAE is the highest decision-making body of the Academy and is held during the first week of June biennially.

Membership 

Membership of Chinese Academy of Engineering is the highest academic title in engineering science and technology in China. It is a lifelong honor and must be elected by existing members.
The Academy consists of members, senior members and foreign members, who are distinguished and recognized for their respective field of engineering.

As of January 2020, the academy has 920 Chinese members, in addition to 93 foreigner members. The composition of its members include:

Deng Zhonghan was elected to the Chinese Academy of Engineering in 2009 at the age of 41, making him the youngest academician in the history of the CAE.

 Division of Mechanical and Vehicle Engineering: 130 members
 Division of Information and Electronic Engineering: 131 members
 Division of Chemical, Metallurgical and Materials Engineering: 115 members
 Division of Energy and Mining Engineering: 125 members
 Division of Civil and Hydraulic Engineering and Architecture: 110 members
 Division of Light Industry and Environmental Engineering: 61 members
 Division of Agriculture: 84 members
 Division of Medicine and Health: 125 members
Division of Engineering Management: 39 members

Criteria and Qualifications
The senior engineers, professors and other scholars or specialists, who shall have the Chinese citizenship (including those who reside in Taiwan, Hong Kong Special Administrative Region, Macao Special Administrative Region and overseas) and who have made significant and creative achievements and contributions in the fields of engineering and technological sciences, are qualified for the membership of the Academy.

Elections of members
The election of new members (academicians) is conducted biennially. Total numbers of members to be elected in each election is decided by the governing body of the Academy. Examination and election of the candidates are done in every Academy Division and the voting is anonymous. The results of the voting is then examined and validated by the governing board.

Publications

Engineering Sciences (journal)
ISSN Print  1009-1724

Engineering (journal)
ISSN Print  2095-8099

ISSN Online  2096-0026

Collaborations 
The Chinese Academy of Engineering has collaborated  with other major academies (in policy development, engineering research projects, etc.), such as those 
from UK and USA:

  Royal Academy of Engineering
  National Academy of Engineering

See also 
 Chinese Academy of Sciences
 Scientific publishing in China

References

External links 
 

National academies of engineering
Research institutes in China
Science and technology in the People's Republic of China
1994 establishments in China